Forotic is a commune in Caraș-Severin County, Banat, Romania with a population of 1,917 people. It is composed of four villages: Brezon (Bársonyfalva), Comorâște (Komornok), Forotic and Surducu Mare (Nagyszurduk).

References

Communes in Caraș-Severin County
Localities in Romanian Banat